Atrytonopsis cestus, the cestus skipper, is a species of grass skipper in the butterfly family Hesperiidae.

The MONA or Hodges number for Atrytonopsis cestus is 4087.

References

Further reading

 

Hesperiinae
Articles created by Qbugbot